Las Locas del conventillo is a 1966 Argentine film scored by Astor Piazzolla.

Cast

External links
 

1966 films
Argentine comedy films
1960s Spanish-language films
Films directed by Fernando Ayala
1960s Argentine films